Cosas de Amigos may refer to:

 Cosas de Amigos (album), 1981 album by Verónica Castro
 Cosas de amigos (film), 2022 Peruvian film